Henrylygus is a genus of plant bugs in the family Miridae. There are at least 2 described species in Henrylygus.

Species
 H. nubilus (Van Duzee, 1914)
 H. ultranubilus (Knight, 1917)

References

 Schwartz, Michael D., and Robert G. Foottit (1998). "Revision of the Nearctic species of the genus Lygus Hahn, with a review of the Palaearctic species (Heteroptera: Miridae)". Memoirs on Entomology, International, vol. 10, vii + 428.
 Thomas J. Henry, Richard C. Froeschner. (1988). Catalog of the Heteroptera, True Bugs of Canada and the Continental United States. Brill Academic Publishers.

Further reading

External links

 NCBI Taxonomy Browser, Henrylygus

Miridae genera
Mirini